Hiroshi Yamamoto is the name of:
 Hiroshi Yamamoto (archer) (born 1962), Japanese Olympic archer
 Hiroshi Yamamoto (comedian) (born 1978), Japanese comedian from the comedy trio Robert (owarai)
 Hiroshi Yamamoto (politician) (born 1954), Japanese politician of the New Komeito Party
 Hiroshi Yamamoto (shogi) (born 1996), professional shogi player
 Hiroshi Yamamoto (sprinter) (1928-1990/1991), Japanese Olympic sprinter